Komori is a Japanese company. Komori may also refer to
Komori (surname)
 Komori Dam in Mie Prefecture, Japan
Pheidole komori, a species of ant 
Komori-san Can't Decline, a Japanese manga
Komori Seikatsu Kojo Club, a 2008 Japanese film
 The Komori ninja in Usagi Yojimbo